Griffin Matthews (born 1981/82) is an American actor, writer, and director. Born in Pittsburgh, Pennsylvania, he graduated from Carnegie Mellon University with a B.F.A. in musical theater.

Matthews served two years in the Peace Corps in West Africa. In 2005, he founded a nonprofit, UgandaProject (originally named Be The Change Uganda), to support the education of teenagers in Uganda.

With husband Matt Gould, Matthews co-wrote the musical Witness Uganda, later retitled Invisible Thread, based on his experience volunteering in Uganda. The musical won the 2014 Richard Rodgers Awards for Musical Theatre in 2012 and 2014.

Matthews appears as fashion designer Luke Jacobson in the 2022 Disney+ series She-Hulk: Attorney at Law. His other television credits include Dear White People, The Flight Attendant, The Mentalist, Weeds, Torchwood, and Law & Order: LA.

Matthews, who is Black, has criticized institutionalized racism in American theater.

Matthews is openly gay. He married composer and writer Matt Gould in 2017; they had met in 2002 through their Peace Corps service in Africa. The couple adopted two sons in August 2022.

References

External links

1980s births
Living people
African-American dramatists and playwrights
African-American male actors
African-American directors
American gay actors
Carnegie Mellon University College of Fine Arts alumni
LGBT African Americans
LGBT people from Pennsylvania
Male actors from Pittsburgh